The Chilia branch is one of three main distributary channels of the river Danube that contributes to forming the Danube Delta. Lying at the northernmost area of the delta, the distributary creates a natural border between Romania and Ukraine (see Romania-Ukraine border) and is named after the two towns carrying the same name, located across from one another on both banks: Kiliya, on the northern, Ukrainian bank and Chilia Veche (Old Chilia) on the southern, Romanian bank.

The other two main branches of the Danube are the Sulina branch and the Sfântu Gheorghe branch.

The Chilia branch begins at the Ismail Islet where Danube splits on Chilia branch and Sulina branch and ends near the town of Vylkove where Chilia branch splits further into Ochakove distributary (eastward) and Old Istambul distributary (southward). The flow at the entrance into the delta is of 6,350 m3/s; the Chilia branch carries between 58 and 60 percent of this flow.

Along the Chilia branch is located the former Ottoman fortress in today's Ukrainian city of Izmail. The fall of Izmail in 1789 led the Ottomans' loss of complete control over the northern Pontic shores (today southern Ukraine) and to the expansion the Russian Empire to this part of the Black Sea, with the continuation of struggles and warring between the Ottoman and Russian Empires.

References

Distributaries of the Danube
Ramsar sites in Ukraine
Romania–Ukraine border
Rivers of Tulcea County